The 2019–20 French Guiana Régional 1 was the 59th season of the French Guiana Régional 1, the top division football competition in French Guiana. The season began on 16 August 2019, and was scheduled to end on 24 May 2020. Due to the COVID-19 pandemic, the season was suspended on 9 March 2020 after the 15th round of matches.

Olympique Cayenne was declared the champions when the season was abandon in June 2020, giving the club their first French Guianese title.

League table
Table at abandonment:

Notes

References

External links
Ligue de Guyane de Football

French Guiana Régional 1 seasons
French Guiana
1
French Guiana